Basidiopycnis is a fungal genus in the family Phleogenaceae. The genus is monotypic, containing the single species Basidiopycnis hyalina, found in Germany.

References

External links
 

Monotypic Basidiomycota genera
Fungi of Europe
Taxa described in 2006
Atractiellales
Taxa named by Franz Oberwinkler